If Beale Street Could Talk is a 2018 American romantic drama film written and directed by Barry Jenkins. Based on James Baldwin's novel of the same name, it follows a young African-American woman who, with her family's support, seeks to clear the name of her wrongly-charged husband and prove his innocence before the birth of their child. The film's cast includes KiKi Layne, Stephan James, Colman Domingo, Teyonah Parris, Michael Beach, Dave Franco, Diego Luna, Pedro Pascal, Ed Skrein, Brian Tyree Henry and Regina King. Nicholas Britell composed the film's musical score, and James Laxton was the cinematographer. The film made its world premiere at the Toronto International Film Festival on September 9, 2018. Annapurna Pictures gave the film a limited release on December 14 before giving it a wide release on December 25. The film grossed $20.6 million on a $12 million budget. Rotten Tomatoes, a review aggregator, surveyed 363 reviews and judged 95% to be positive.

If Beale Street Could Talk gained awards and nominations in a variety of categories with particular praise for Jenkin's direction, King's performance as Sharon Rivers, Britell's score, and Laxton's cinematography. King won Best Supporting Actress at the 91st Academy Awards where the film also received nominations for Best Adapted Screenplay and Best Original Score. At the 34th Independent Spirit Awards, the film won all three of its nominations for Best Feature, Best Director, Best Supporting Female (King). King also received Best Supporting Actress awards at the 76th Golden Globe Awards and the 24th Critics' Choice Awards. Both the National Board of Review and American Film Institute included it in their top 10 films of 2018.

Accolades

Notes

See also
 2018 in film

References

External links 
 

Lists of accolades by film